Nyhamar is a surname. Notable people with the surname include:

Jostein Nyhamar (1922–1993), Norwegian magazine editor, biographer and politician 
Unni Nyhamar Hinkel, Norwegian handball player

Norwegian-language surnames